Burgruine Pikeroi is a ruined castle in Styria, Austria.

See also
List of castles in Austria

References

Castles in Styria
Ruined castles in Austria